Cinetata is a monotypic genus of dwarf spiders containing the single species, Cinetata gradata. It was first described by J. Wunderlich in 1995, and has only been found in Georgia.

See also
 List of Linyphiidae species

References

Linyphiidae
Monotypic Araneomorphae genera